Margaret Russell, Baroness Ampthill,  ( Lady Margaret Lygon; 8 October 1874 – 12 December 1957) was an English courtier and Red Cross volunteer, known for her long friendship with Queen Mary.

Russell was born in London, the daughter of Frederick Lygon, 6th Earl Beauchamp and Lady Mary Stanhope, daughter of Philip Stanhope, 5th Earl Stanhope. She married the 2nd Baron Ampthill, a civil servant, in 1894.

Lord Ampthill served as Governor of Madras from 1900 to 1906. She was appointed a Companion of the Order of the Crown of India in 1900 and awarded a gold Kaisar-i-Hind Medal in 1906.

Lady Margaret first became friends with Queen Mary in 1891, when she was known as Princess May. Lady Margaret was appointed a Lady of the Bedchamber to Queen Mary in 1911, but was honoured by four monarchs for her charity work.

In 1918, she was appointed a Dame Grand Cross of the Order of the British Empire for her work with the Red Cross during the First World War and a Dame Grand Cross of the Royal Victorian Order in 1946 for her work as aa courtier. She was also a Dame of Grace of the Venerable Order of Saint John of Jerusalem.

After her death, Viscount Templewood eulogised her in The Times and commented on her friendship with Queen Mary:

Issue
Lady Margaret married Oliver Russell, 2nd Baron Ampthill in Madresfield, Worcestershire on 6 October 1894, two days before her 20th birthday. The Ampthills had four sons and one daughter:

 John Russell, 3rd Baron Ampthill (1896–1973), succeeded his father 
 Admiral Hon. Sir Guy Herbrand Edward Russell (1898–1977), Royal Navy commander
 Wing Commander Hon. Edward Wriothesley Curzon Russell   (2 June 1901 – 1982), married Baroness Barbara Korff and had issue
 Brig Hon. Leopold Oliver Russell  (26 January 1907 – 1988)
 Hon. Phyllis Margaret Russell  (3 June 1909 – c. 16 April 1998), Lady-in-Waiting to Princess Mary, married William George Preston Thorold (annulled 1942)

She died in Hammersmith, London, aged 83.

Arms

References

External links

1874 births
1957 deaths
British baronesses
Companions of the Order of the Crown of India
Dames Grand Cross of the Order of the British Empire
Dames Grand Cross of the Royal Victorian Order
Dames of Grace of the Order of St John
Double dames
Daughters of British earls
Ladies of the Bedchamber
People from Worcestershire
Recipients of the Kaisar-i-Hind Medal
Ampthill
Margaret
Wives of knights